John A. Wall (November 30, 1847 – June 24, 1886) was an American lawyer and politician.

Born in Milwaukee County, Wisconsin Territory, Wall studied law with Edward George Ryan, Chief Justice of the Wisconsin Supreme Court and was admitted to the Wisconsin bar. He practiced law. He served in the Wisconsin State Assembly, in 1883, as a Democrat.

Notes

1847 births
1886 deaths
People from Milwaukee County, Wisconsin
Wisconsin lawyers
19th-century American politicians
19th-century American lawyers
Democratic Party members of the Wisconsin State Assembly